Fatih Yaşarlı is a Turkish freestyle wrestler competing in the 97 kg and 125 kg divisions. He is a member of Ankara Tedaş.

Career 

In 2019, he won bronze medal in the men's 97 kg event at the 2019 Military World Games held in Wuhan, China.

References

External links
 

1991 births
Living people
Turkish male sport wrestlers
Wrestlers at the 2019 European Games
European Games competitors for Turkey